Kim Min-ji (born April 11, 1992)  is a South Korean actress. She also hosted Music Bank from December 2010 to October 2011.

From 2013 to 2016, she was known as Seo Min-ji. She later used her birth name again.

Filmography

Television series 
 Here He Comes (MBC, 2008) - Kim Min-ji
 Empress Cheonchu (KBS2, 2009) - young Lady Kim
 Boys Over Flowers (KBS2, 2009) - Jang Yu-mi
 Again, My Love (KBS2, 2009) - young Hye-jeong
 A Man Called God (MBC, 2010) - Hye-jeong
 Drama Special - The Scary One, The Ghost and I (KBS2, 2010) - Ghost
 Golden Cross (KBS2, 2014) - Kang Ha-yoon (first credit with new stage name)
 Midnight's Girl (MBC every1, 2015) - Min Se-ra
 Persevere, Goo Hae Ra (Mnet, 2015) - Scarlet (Grace Hwang)
 The Ace (SBS, 2015) - Park Soo-min
 Woman with a Suitcase (MBC, 2016) - Seo Ji-ah (first credit under her birth name after three years)
 Manhole (KBS2, 2017)
 Rich Man (MBN & Dramax, 2018)

Film 
 The Boy from Ipanema (2010) - girl
 Finding Mr. Destiny (2010) - Chae-ri

Variety show 
 Music Bank (KBS2, 2010-2011)

Music videos 
 Epik High - "1분 1초" (2008)
 Zia - "터질 것 같아" (2009)
 Clazziquai - "Wizard of Oz" (2009)

Music drama

References

External links 
 
 

South Korean child actresses
South Korean film actresses
South Korean television actresses
1992 births
Living people